The Czech Stop and Little Czech Bakery is a combination deli/bakery and convenience store located in the city of West, Texas.

Established in 1983, the store serves traditional Czech cuisine such as kolache, klobasnek and strudels. The city is notable for its Czech heritage and was designated as the "Home of the official Kolache of the Texas Legislature".  The store serves around 600 people a day and is a popular stop for travelers along Interstate 35.

According to a poster in the store, the Czech Stop uses over 1,200 lbs of cream cheese, 9,000 lbs of flour, 750 gallons of milk, 2,400 lbs of butter 1,300 lbs of sausage, 2,100 dozen eggs, and 2,500 lbs of American cheese each week to produce its baked goods.

The Czech Stop remained open after the West Fertilizer Company explosion on April 17, 2013, to serve local residents and first responders.

The store has been featured in Southern Living, Primetime: What Would You Do? on ABC, and on The Oprah Winfrey Show.

See also
 Bohemian Cafe

References

External links
 Czech Stop website
 Bakery review

1983 establishments in Texas
Bakeries of the United States
Buildings and structures in McLennan County, Texas
Czech restaurants in the United States
Czech-American culture in Texas
Restaurants established in 1983
Restaurants in Texas
West, Texas